The Famine Walls were a series of walls built throughout western and southern Ireland in the mid-19th century, during the Great Famine. The walls were built as famine-relief works projects run by churches and landlords to provide work and income for unemployed peasants. As payment, workers received food or money, and the walls served little practical purpose other than giving work to the poor and clearing the land of stones.

The walls are around 8-10 feet high and 300 yards long. Along some of the walls are periodic holes built in to the structures, which records say were a way for two parties to stand on opposite sides of the wall and touch fingers through a hole, signifying making an agreement or contract.

References 

Ireland
Great Famine (Ireland)
History of Ireland